Ayr Castle was a castle situated at Ayr in Scotland. Once considered a royal castle, nothing remains of it above ground.

History
In 1197, the castle was built by King William the Lion of Scotland, who later in 1205 created a burgh at Ayr. The castle was captured by the Norwegian King Håkon Håkonsson and a substantial Norwegian army in 1263 which led to the Battle of Largs after which it returned to Scottish control. Robert the Bruce burned the castle in August 1298 in order to keep it out of the hands of the English. The castle in 1542 was garrisoned by French troops and appears to have been demolished before the Cromwellian occupation between 1650–1651.

References

External links
 https://thecastleguy.co.uk/castle/ayr-castle/

Castles in South Ayrshire
Former castles in Scotland
Houses completed in 1197
History of South Ayrshire
1197 establishments in Scotland
17th-century disestablishments in Scotland
Buildings and structures in Ayr